Martin Barták (born 14 February 1967) is a Czech politician. He was the Minister of Defence in the caretaker government of Jan Fischer.

References 

1967 births
Living people
Defence ministers of the Czech Republic
Czech physicians
Charles University alumni
Civic Democratic Party (Czech Republic) Government ministers